Agonidium cyanipenne is a species of ground beetle in the subfamily Platyninae! It was described by Henry Walter Bates in 1892.

References

cyanipenne
Beetles described in 1892